Otto V, Count of Wittelsbach ( – 4 August 1156), also called Otto IV, Count of Scheyern, was the second son of Eckhard I, Count of Scheyern and Richardis of Carniola and Istria. Otto named himself Otto of Wittelsbach, after Wittelsbach Castle near Aichach. He served Henry V, Holy Roman Emperor, in his first Italian Expedition in 1110–1111. Emperor Henry V already addressed him as Otto Count of "Witlinesbac" in a document in 1115. From 1120 onwards, he was Count palatine of Bavaria.

From 1110 to 1111 Otto V was in the First Italian Campaign in the entourage of German King Henry V. During this campaign, King Henry and Count Otto had kidnapped Pope Paschal II in order for the Pope to crown Henry Emperor of the Holy Roman Empire.

When the ancestral seat of the von Scheyern family was relocated to Wittelsbach Castle near Aichach, Otto began calling himself 'Otto V. of Wittelsbach' in 1116. He was thus the namesake for the ruling house of the Wittelsbachers, who ruled Bavaria until 1918.

Since Otto had participated in the capture of Pope Paschal in 1111, he was excommunicated from church, along with Emperor Henry. In order to atone for his sins for kidnapping the earlier Pope, (who was now deceased) Otto founded the Augustinian monastery and church in Indersdorf in 1120, in order for the present Pope, Calixtus II, to remove the excommunication.

Marriage and children
Otto married Heilika of Pettendorf-Lengenfeld, a daughter of Count Frederick III of Pettendorf-Lengenfeld-Hopfenohe, on 13 July 1116.

Their marriage produced eight children:
 Hermann
 Otto, VI Count Palatine, I Duke of Bavaria
 Conrad of Wittelsbach, Archbishop of Mainz and then Archbishop of Salzburg
 Frederick II of Wittelsbach (died 1198 or 1199) married 1184 a daughter of the Count of Mangold (Donau)wörth
 Udalrich of Wittelsbach (died 29 March 1179)
 Otto VII, Count Palatine (died 1189) married Benedicta of Donauwörth, daughter of the Count of Mangold (Donau)wörth. Father of:
 Otto VIII, Count Palatine of Bavaria, who killed Philip of Swabia
 Hedwig (died 16 July 1174) married (before 1153) Berthold III, Count of Andechs ( – 14 December 1188)
 Adelheid married Otto II of Stefling

Ancestry

References

Sources

Counts Palatine of the Holy Roman Empire
House of Wittelsbach
1080s births
1156 deaths